Bullshit Motorcycle Club, most commonly shortened to Bullshit MC, was a Danish outlaw motorcycle gang and organized criminal group active during the 1980s. They were best known for engaging in a violent turf war against the rivaling Hells Angels Motorcycle Club.
Bullshit MC formed during the late 1970s in Tårnby, Amager as the result of a merger between the Filthy Few and Nøragersmindebanden, two outlaw motorcycle clubs who had decided to band together in an effort to oppose the takeover of the ambitious Hells Angels, who had then recently expanded into Scandinavia.

History
Beginning with New Zealand in 1961, the American-founded Hells Angels Motorcycle Club (HAMC) began setting up charters internationally in countries like England, Germany and Canada. Such nations had an outlaw motorcyclist movement of their own and despite them being a influential and highly respected force within the subculture, a portion of biker gang members and "one-percenter" clubs alike adversed the integration and assertiveness of the foreign-rooted HAMC. One of many of such groups was Bullshit Motorcycle Club, a homegrown Danish biker gang that emerged in 1979.

At the time of the creation of Bullshit MC, the Hells Angels had still been relatively new to the Northern European nation of Denmark as the ladder had only opened up their first Scandinavian chapter (in Denmark) in 1980. Nevertheless, the aspiring Hells Angels had the intention of monopolizing Scandinavia's drug trade and planned to be the region's dominant motorcycle club.
Members of Bullshit MC were also younger and less organized than their Hells Angels rivals with many of them coming from dysfunctional households. Contrastingly, bikers belonging to the Hells Angles Motorcycle Club followed the mentality set by the group's overseas chapters as the organization (in its entirety) was becoming more structured and set up more like a Mafia syndicate.

Relatively soon after their formation, Bullshit MC became major players in Copenhagen's illicit narcotics trade, and quickly rose to control much of the city's lucrative drug market. By the time that 1984 rolled around, Bullshit MC set up shop in Freetown Christiania and had managed to conquer of the area's hashish trade. Members reportedly participated in a number of threats and assaults towards residents which, in combination with their gangsterist company, caused much resentment towards the club's presence within the autonomous district.

Copenhagen Biker War

The nearly 3-year conflict between the two groups commenced on September 24 of 1983 after three members of Bullshit MC, accompanied by a female associate, confronted some Hells Angels at their local hangout. A fight quickly broke out and two of the three Bullshit members, Søren Grabow Grander and Flemming Hald Jensen were killed by the wounds they sustained from a knife and broken bottle.

On May 25, 1984, high-ranking Hells Angels biker and Danish chapter co-founder Jørn "Jønke" Nielsen walked up to the car of Bullshit MC president  and fired 17 bullets at him with a submachinegun. The victim's wife, Pia Soldthved Larsen, was also present in the vehicle but survived the attack. The couple had apparently been on their way to sell hashish in Christiania. Knudsen's murder received national media attention.

Bullshit member Palle "Lillebror" Blåbjerg subsequently replaced Knudsen as club president after his death in 1984. On April 26 of 1985, Blåbjerg would end up being shot dead by a member of the Morticians MC - a Hells Angels affiliated support club.

Consequent to the killing of Blåbjerg, Bullshit member Anker Walther Markus was appointed as the group's third president. His tenure would not last long, however. He was fatally shot by three men in jogging suits on December 21, 1985, while at a tavern managed by the club in Freetown Christiania. Additionally, an unaffiliated civilian bystander is also killed in the crossfire of Markus' assassination. Two Hells Angels prospects and fully-patched Hells Angels member Dan Lynge would subsequently be convicted of the murders.

In 1986, Bullshit member Jan Sonberg was executed in front of the gang's Kirkegårdsvej clubhouse by then-HAMC prospect Nick Jacobsen. The slaying apparently took place as part of a gang initiation for him to become a fully-patched Hells Angels member. Jacobsen later received a life sentence for the crime.

The skirmish between the two warring gangs came to an end in 1986 after Michael Linde, the newly-elected fourth (and final) president of Bullshit MC, contacted the Hells Angels clubhouse and voluntarily declared that the war was over.

Dissolution and legacy

Following the deaths of three of its presidents along with several other members, the gang war concluded with the Hells Angels emerging as the dominant outlaw biker club in Scandinavia.

Bullshit Motorcycle Club shut down their stronghold in Christiania following the outcome of the conflict and officially folded as a whole in 1988.

References 

1979 establishments in Denmark
Organizations established in 1979
1988 disestablishments in Denmark
Organizations disestablished in 1988
Organizations based in Copenhagen
Defunct clubs and societies
Outlaw motorcycle clubs
Gangs in Denmark
Crime in Copenhagen